"You Are Blue, So Am I" is Bonnie Pink's thirteenth single and first from the album Let Go. The single was released under the East West Japan label on March 1, 2000.

Track listing
You Are Blue, So Am I

New York

Oricon Sales Chart

2000 singles
2000 songs
Bonnie Pink songs
Songs written by Bonnie Pink